Andrew Griffiths may refer to:

 Andrew Griffiths (field hockey) (born 1969), former field hockey forward from Canada
 Andrew Griffiths (politician) (born 1970), English politician
 Andrew Griffiths (author), Australian author of business books
 Andy Griffiths (author) (born 1961), Australian children's book author
 Andy Griffiths (executive), CEO of consumer appliances at Glen Dimplex

See also
 Andrew Griffith
 Andy Griffith